is a Japanese comedy, drama film directed by Keisuke Yoshida and starring Horikita Maki.  It was released on December 21, 2013.

The story is about parent-child love, in which an otaku girl who works at an anime shop aims to become a voice actor, but her mother died who once abandoned her and her brother. She follows in the footsteps of her youth and visits her mother's hometown. Director Yoshida spent seven years on the concept of this original work.

Cast
 Horikita Maki as Mugiko
 Matsuda Ryuhei as Norio
 Yo Kimiko as Saiko

Plot

Mugiko is a young woman who lives with her older brother in Tokyo. She works part-time in a manga and anime store, and wants to study to be a voice actress. The siblings' mother, Saiko, left their father when they were young, and Mugiko doesn't remember her. When their mother unexpectedly reappears and asks to live with them, her children reluctantly agree. But she dies soon after, without reconciling with her kids.

Mugiko travels alone to Saiko's small mountain hometown to inter her mother's ashes. There, she's a sensation because she looks so much like her mother, once an aspiring singer who had many male admirers. A mix-up leads to Mugiko's staying in the town for several days, where she gets to know several local residents whose own life stories partly parallel her own. Mugiko, who had referred to Saiko only as "that woman," begins to think of Saiko as her mother.

References

External links

Films directed by Keisuke Yoshida
2013 films
2010s Japanese films